Sallai Meridor (born 1955) is an Israeli politician. He was the Israeli Ambassador to the United States between 2005–2009, appointed by Prime Minister Ehud Olmert.

Career
Meridor was an aide to Moshe Arens when he was the Foreign Minister of Israel in the late 1980s.

Meridor served as the Chairman of the Jewish Agency for Israel and the World Zionist Organization from 1999–2005, Treasurer of the Jewish Agency and WZO and as the Head of the Settlement Division of the WZO. Meridor also serves as the international chairman for the Jerusalem Foundation.

Family
Meridor's father was Eliyahu Meridor, the Commander of the Irgun (Etzel) and member of Knesset.

Meridor's older brother Dan Meridor was a minister in several Israeli governments. His two other older siblings are Haggit Hurvitz, Head of Pediatrics at the Bikur Holim Hospital, and Avital Darmon, Director of the Applied Research Initiative in Education.

Dan Meirdor's son is Shaul Meridor, the deputy director of the Allocation Branch at the Ministry of Finance. Another nephew of Sallai Meridor is Eli Hurvitz (Meridor), son of Haggit Hurvitz and the executive director of the Trump Foundation.

See also
List of Israeli ambassadors to the United States
Israel-United States relations
Jewish Agency for Israel

References

External links

Press Statement:  Israeli Ambassador Sallai Meridor Reacts to Tragedy at Virginia Tech; April 17, 2007

1955 births
Living people
Israeli Jews
People from Jerusalem
Ambassadors of Israel to the United States
Heads of the Jewish Agency for Israel
Hebrew University of Jerusalem alumni